The Thomasines were a Christian sect that originated in the first or the second century who especially revered the apostle Thomas and who originated the gospel of Thomas. The sect held esoteric, mystical, and ascetic ideas. They have been associated with the proto-Gnostics. However modern critics have disputed their affiliation with Gnosticism, especially because they lack many Gnostic beliefs.

History 
According to one view the Thomasines were an early group that questioned the authority of the Jerusalem church and the apostle James, with the Thomasine church beginning around the middle of the first century in Syria.

Elaine Pagels dates the Thomasine community to around the time of the Gospel of John’s compilation (AD 70–110), as the Gospel of John appears to contain anti-Thomasine elements and the Johannine community may have splintered off from the same group as the Thomasine.

Other views suppose the Thomasines to be a second century Gnostic sect.

Community 
The Thomasine communities had leaders who through social rules, attempted to manage the process by which new proselytes could come in. They minimized the importance of money and were not expected to have any extra income from what they did not give away. The community had a social attitude of "diligence", where the leader of the community demonstrates a consistent structure for community activities, including labor.

Beliefs

Soteriology 
For the Thomasines Jesus is the Light, who has gone to the place of light and his followers have to try to come to the light by the means of a mystical ascent. The Thomasines saw themselves as children of the light, but the ones who were not part of the elect community were sons of darkness. The Thomasines thus had a belief in a type of election or predestination, they saw themselves as elect because they were born from the light.

The Gospel of Thomas says to keep the sabbath to be saved, however it is likely a metaphor for inner rest.

The Thomasines had semi-ascetic ideas.

Eschatology 
In Thomasine theology the one who seeks the light will have a journey that ultimately ends in "rest". The decision to follow Jesus is critical because the judgement is already being done in the world and the universe could end at any time.

Christology 
The Gospel of Thomas refers to Jesus as the "son of man" and affirms his Lordship. For the Thomasines, Jesus was too complex to be categorized or given a description. However some passages in the gospel of Thomas possibly indicate Jesus having some divinity.

Gnosticism 
In the past the Gnosticism of the gospel of Thomas was the common view among scholarship, however modern research has questioned the affinity between Gnosticism and the gospel of Thomas. Many scholars believe that the gospel of Thomas has a Gnostic worldview, but on the other hand many also reject the Gnostic affiliations because they do not seem to have the same Gnostic mythology as Irenaeus describes and the form of mysticism in the Gospel of Thomas lacks many Gnostic elements. The Gospel of Thomas also appears to support the sanctity of the incarnate life which seems to contradict Gnostic teaching which was used by Paterson Brown to argue that the gospel is demostrably non-Gnostic. According to David W. Kim the association of the Thomasines and Gnosticism are too anachronistic and the Thomasine sect seems to predate the Gnostic movements.

According to Andrew Phillip the Thomasines did not adhere to a form of Gnosticism, but they still held to strongly esoteric views with apparent Platonic influence.

Other 
The Thomasines likely had a form of baptism.

References 

Christian mysticism